Lintz is a small village in County Durham, England.

Lintz may also refer to:

People
Gertrude Davies Lintz (died 1968), English-American socialite, dog breeder, and keeper of exotic animals
Larry Lintz (born 1949), American professional baseball player
Matt Lintz (born 2001), American actor

Places
Lintz Green railway station, station on the Derwent Valley Railway in County Durham, England
Lintz Addition, West Virginia, unincorporated community in Logan County, West Virginia

See also
Linz (disambiguation)
Lentz (disambiguation)